Josefsberg Pass (el. 1012 m.) is a high mountain pass in the Austrian Alps in the Bundesland of Lower Austria.

It connects Annaberg and Mitterbach and has a maximum grade of 10 percent.

See also
 List of highest paved roads in Europe
 List of mountain passes

Mountain passes of the Alps
Mountain passes of Lower Austria